Nikodimos "Nikki" Papavasiliou (born 31 August 1970) is a Cypriot football manager and former international midfielder. He is currently the manager of National Bank of Egypt in the Egyptian Premier League. Aside from playing and managing, Papavasiliou's background includes scouting and Academy management. He was the first Cypriot to play in the FA Premier League.

Playing career

Club career
Papavasiliou began his pro football career in 1988 with Greek Alpha Ethniki club OFI, having arrived from England nd the youth teams of Oldham Athletic and Arsenal. He spent five years with the Cretan top-tier side during its "golden years", establishing himself as an attacking midfielder under coach Eugène Gerards. In August 1993, Papavasiliou was transferred to Newcastle United for £120,000 signing a two-year contract and thus becoming the first Cypriot to play in the FA Premier League. He made his Newcastle debut against Tottenham on 14 August 1993. He went on to play for two seasons at the club before returning to OFI in 1994.

He returned to Cyprus in 1996 signing for First Division club Apollon Limassol, where he stayed four years. In 2000, Papavasiliou was acquired by Anorthosis Famagusta, but after playing with them through the 2000–01 season, he was subsequently loaned out to Enosis Neon Paralimni and Olympiakos Nicosia. He then moved to APOEL, where he played his final season, opting to retire his playing career in 2003.

International career
Papavasiliou has represented Cyprus for 9 years during 1990–1999, making a total of 38 national caps and scoring five goals.

Managerial career

Papavasiliou holds the English UEFA A Licence and also the UEFA Pro Licence. He began his managerial career in Cyprus, first at APE Pitsilia in the 2006–07 Cypriot Second Division and then moving to Olympiakos Nicosia, who had recently been relegated to the Second Division after many decades in the top flight. Papavasiliou led the Green−Blacks throughout their 2007–08 campaign, but missed out on promotion in the final match of the competition, in which his side was defeated 2–1 by fellow promotion contenders Nea Salamis, who thus finished in the promotion zone and left Olympiakos in fourth place.

In the summer of 2009, Papavasiliou returned to Greece and the team where he made his name as a player, OFI, where he was paired up with former OFI teammate Myron Sifakis to lead the club during its 2009–10 Beta Ethniki campaign. The duo were however sacked after poor performances at the start of the competition. He returned to Cyprus and Olympiakos Nicosia, this time completing the club's comeback to the First Division after securing third place in the 2009–10 campaign. He left the club in the summer of 2010 and spent the next six months managing Doxa Katokopia until January 2011, and then one year at Enosis Neon Paralimni, whom he led to an all-time best sixth-place finish in the First Division in 2011. In February 2012, Papavasiliou was hired as manager of Olympiakos Nicosia for the third time in his managerial career.

In September 2012, Papavasiliou reached an agreement with Apollon Limassol, for whom he had played from 1996 to 2000, and mutually terminated his contract with Olympiakos to complete the move. He did not manage to finish the season with the club, as he was sacked in March 2013, after a 9–6–6 record. In September 2014, he was appointed manager of Ermis Aradippou, but once again he was fired after several bad results in February 2015.

On 21 August 2015 Papavasiliou was hired as manager of Slovak First Football League side Slovan Bratislava, whom he led to the 2016 Slovak Cup Final. He finished the season in second place behind double-winners AS Trenčín, boasting an impressive .64 win ratio. His second season with the club came to an abrupt end however, as he was fired after the third game of the 2016–17 season

In May 2018, Papavasiliou was appointed manager of Greek Football League side Ergotelis. He managed to lead the club to its first Greek Cup Quarter-finals since 1986 during his first season as club manager. His work did not go unnoticed and in September 2019 he was offered the head coach position of struggling Super League side Panionios. Papavasiliou thus terminated his contract with Ergotelis, accepting the bid and thus making his Super League managerial debut.

Managerial statistics

Other
Papavasiliou has accumulated substantial experience and expertise in scouting, and Academy management, having worked as a scout for FA Premier League clubs Bolton Wanderers and Newcastle United. He is also the owner of Nikki Football Academy in Cyprus.

References

External links

1970 births
Living people
Sportspeople from Limassol
Greek Cypriot people
Cypriot footballers
Cyprus international footballers
Association football midfielders
Newcastle United F.C. players
Anorthosis Famagusta F.C. players
Apollon Limassol FC players
Enosis Neon Paralimni FC players
Olympiakos Nicosia players
APOEL FC players
OFI Crete F.C. players
Super League Greece players
Cypriot First Division players
Premier League players
Expatriate footballers in England
Expatriate footballers in Greece
Olympiakos Nicosia managers
OFI Crete F.C. managers
Ermis Aradippou FC managers
ŠK Slovan Bratislava managers
Ergotelis F.C. managers
Cypriot expatriate footballers
Bolton Wanderers F.C. non-playing staff
Cypriot football managers
Wadi Degla SC managers
Nea Salamis Famagusta FC managers
Ghazl El Mahalla SC managers
Cypriot expatriate football managers
Cypriot expatriate sportspeople in Slovakia
Expatriate football managers in Slovakia
Cypriot expatriate sportspeople in Greece
Cypriot expatriate sportspeople in England
Expatriate football managers in Egypt
Egyptian Premier League managers